The Star of Military Valour is a decoration that is, within the Canadian system of honours, the second highest award for military valour, and one of three honours for military valour awarded by the Canadian monarch, generally through his or her viceroy-in-Council. Created in 1993, the medal is presented to both living and deceased members of the Canadian Forces deemed to have demonstrated "distinguished and valiant service in the presence of the enemy," and grants recipients the ability to use the post-nominal letters SMV.

History
On 2 February 1993, three decorations, including the Star of Military Valour, were created by Queen Elizabeth II as a family of Canadian military valour decorations. The first awarding of the star was by Governor General Michaëlle Jean, on 27 October 2006; only with Canada's participation in the 2001 invasion of Afghanistan did there emerge, for the first time since 1993, circumstances wherein one could carry out actions deserving of the Star of Military Valour.

Design
The Star of Military Valour is in the form of a silver-gilt compass star Celeste with a maple leaf in each angle. On the obverse is a roundel at the centre of the star, bearing a gold maple leaf on a red enamel background and surrounded by a silver laurel wreath. The reverse bears on the upper arm the royal cypher of the reigning monarch beneath St. Edward's Crown—symbolizing the Canadian monarch's roles as both fount of honour and Commander-in-Chief of the Canadian Forces—and the inscription . Below this is engraved the name and rank of the recipient.

This medallion is worn on the left chest, on a  crimson ribbon with two vertical white stripes: for men, hung from a bar, and for women, on a ribbon bow, both pinned to the left chest. Should an individual already possessing a Star of Military Valour be awarded the medal again for subsequent valorous acts, he or she is granted a simple gold medal bar, bearing a maple leaf at its centre, for wear on the ribbon from which the original medal is suspended.

Eligibility and receipt
The star is awarded only to members of the Canadian Forces, or members of allied armed forces serving alongside the Canadian Forces, who have shown conspicuous acts of valour in the face of enemy hostility. Should a person meet these criteria, nominations are made through his or her chain of command to the Military Valour Decorations Advisory Committee—a part of the Chancellery of Honours at Government House—which then makes its recommendations to the Governor General of Canada, via the Chief of the Defence Staff. Once they have been decorated with the Star of Military Valour, recipients are granted the right to use the post-nominal letters SMV. The Star of Military Valour can be awarded posthumously, as well as multiple times.

Recipients

In chronological order, the recipients have been:
 Sergeant Patrick Tower , awarded 25 October 2006
 Major William Hilton Fletcher , awarded 18 December 2006
 Private Jess Randall Larochelle , awarded 14 March 2007
 Corporal Sean Teal , awarded 14 March 2007
 Major David Quick , awarded 8 January 2008
 Sergeant William Kenneth MacDonald , awarded 4 April 2008
 Master-Corporal J. Donovan Ball , awarded 26 June 2008
 Captain Jonathan Snyder , awarded posthumously 26 June 2008
 Warrant Officer David Shultz , awarded 13 November 2009
 Master Corporal Jeremy Pinchin , awarded 4 June 2010
 3 unnamed members of the Canadian Special Operations Forces Command, awarded 11 March 2011
 Captain Gabriel Chasse-Jean , awarded 11 June 2011
 Master Warrant Officer Richard Stacey , awarded 11 June 2011
 Corporal Jean-François Belzil , awarded 18 September 2012
 Private Taumy St-Hilaire , awarded 15 November 2012 
 Senior Chief Petty Officer (SEAL) Thomas Arthur Ratzlaff  

In 2014, La Promenade building in the parliamentary precinct in Ottawa was renamed the Valour Building to honour the recipients of the Star of Military Valour.

See also
 Canadian order of precedence (decorations and medals)
 State decoration

References

External links

 
 

Military awards and decorations of Canada
Courage awards